The International Development Committee is a select committee of the House of Commons in the Parliament of the United Kingdom. The remit of the committee is to examine the expenditure, administration and policy of the international aid functions of the Foreign, Commonwealth and Development Office and public bodies which work with the Office in relation to international aid and official development assistance. The Independent Commission for Aid Impact reports to this Select Committee.

The committee was responsible for scrutiny of the International Development Committee's predecessor, the Department for International Development.

Current membership

As of July 2022, the committee's membership is as follows:

Changes since 2019

Membership 2017-2019 
The chair was elected on 12 July 2017, with the members of the committee being announced on 11 September 2017.

Changes 2017-2019

Membership 2015-2017 
The chair was elected on 18 June 2015, with members being announced on 8 July 2015.

Changes 2015-2017

Membership 2010-2015 
The chair was elected on 10 June 2010, with members being announced on 12 July 2010.

Changes 2010-2015

List of committee chairs

See also
List of Committees of the United Kingdom Parliament

References

External links
International Development Committee

Select Committees of the British House of Commons
1997 establishments in the United Kingdom